This is a list of VTV dramas released in 1994.

←1982-1993 - 1994 - 1995→

Vietnamese dramas on VTV1 night time slot
VTV1 night time slot during this time comprises the time slot for new dramas (mainly foreign ones) on Wednesday-Friday-Sunday nights and the time slot for Vietnamese feature films playback on Saturday night. There was only one Vietnamese film aired in this time slot in the year and no new Tet drama released.

Note: There were still several playbacks of Vietnamese feature films or dramas aired on morning or afternoon time slots on VTV1.

VTV1 Sunday Literature & Art dramas
New time slot was created this year as a collaboration between Vietnam Television Audio Visual Center and Film Subcommittee from VTV's Literature & Art Committee.

These dramas air in Sunday afternoon on VTV1 as a part of the program Sunday Literature & Art (Vietnamese: Văn nghệ Chủ Nhật).

Note: The airtime with an asterisk (*) at the end indicates that the broadcast order is undefined

See also
 List of dramas broadcast by Vietnam Television (VTV)
 List of dramas broadcast by Hanoi Radio Television (HanoiTV)
 List of dramas broadcast by Vietnam Digital Television (VTC)

References

External links
VTV.gov.vn – Official VTV Website 
VTV.vn – Official VTV Online Newspaper 

Vietnam Television original programming
1994 in Vietnamese television